Harekrishna Deka (born 1943) is one of Assam's contemporary writers whose excellence in multiple genres is well attested by his works as well by the influence he has had on generations of readers and creative practitioners—his assured style and manner of exposition serving as the bridge between the Assamese greats of the twentieth century and the innovatively inclined writers of the present. As a man whose professional career involved his service in Assam Police, Deka has now a substantial body of writings that showcase his intellectual bearings and adeptly reflect the transitional phase in contemporary Assamese literature. Although he began writing poetry as a hobby while working on the police force, he later quit to become a writer. He was the Director General of Police for Assam from 2000–2003.

Poetry career
Harekrishna Deka is one of the most prominent poet-critics of his generation. He started writing poems and short stories since his student days. He was one of the most prolific writers of Assam's Ramdhenu Era.

He was awarded the Sahitya Academy Award for his poetic contribution in Ann Ejan in 1987, and he was awarded the Katha Award for his short story, Bandiyar (Prisoner) in 1995. After retiring as the DGP of Assam, Deka was the editor of the English daily, The Sentinel for brief period before serving as editor of the Assamese literary monthly Gariyasi.

Awards 
He won the Assam Literary Award in 2010.

Bibliography

Poetry
 Swarabor (Voices) 1972
 Ratir Sobhajatra (Procession by Night) 1978
 Aan Ejan (Another One), 1986, also translated to Bengali and Oriya
 Kabita 1960-1980 (Poems 1960-1980), 2002
 Bhalpoar Babe Exar (A Word for Love), 2003
 Xanmihali Barnamala (Mixed Alphabets), 2010
 Sea-Scare (poems translated to English), 2001

Short stories
 Prakritik aru Anyanya (The Natural and other stories), 1900
 Madhusudanar Dolong (Madhusudan's Bridge), 1992
 Bandiyar (Captive), 1996, Also translated to Oriya
 Post-modern athaba Galpa (Post-modern or Short Story), 2001
 Mrityudanda (Death Sentence), 2006
 Galpa aru Kalpa (Story and Fiction), 2009

Literary criticism
 Adhunikatavad aru Anyanya Prabandha (Modernism and other essays), 1998
 Beekson aru Xandhan (Insight and Investigation), 2000
 Dristi aru Sristi (Look and Creation), 2006
 Nilamani Phukan: Kabi aru Kabita (Nilamani Phukan: the poet and his poems), 2010

Novels
 Agantuk (Strangers), 2008

Edited books
Tarun Prajanmar Kabita (Poetry of the Young Generation), 2005

Translations
 Pratixarita Rashmi (Refracted Light). Translation of poems of Saint John Perse, Yanis Ritsos, Vasco Popa and Jaroslav Seifert, 1992

Social criticism
 Prabrajan aru Anupravex (Immigration and Infiltration), 2010
 Xarbabhoumatva, Xantraxvad aru Nagarik Xamaj (Sovereignty, Terrorism and Civil Society), 2010

See also
 North-East India
 Assamese Literature
 Literature from North East India

External links
 Official Website of Harekrishna Deka
 Indian Review: Harekrishna Deka Wins the Assam Valley Literary Award, 2010 
 An Interview with the Poet: Harekrishna Deka
 An Introduction to Harekrisha Deka’s Poetry by Prabhat Bora
 Harekrishna Deka: In discussion with Uddipana Goswami
 INTERVIEW WITH HAREKRISHNA DEKA, POET AND RETIRED POLICE OFFICER, BY UDDIPANA GOSWAMI ON 20TH MARCH, 2006.
 Harekrishna Deka's Poems in Kavitayan
 The Prisoner - short story
 The Dawn (An Assamese Poem of Harekrishna Deka in Translation

Writers from Northeast India
Poets from Assam
Living people
Assamese-language poets
Recipients of the Sahitya Akademi Award in Assamese
Recipients of the Assam Valley Literary Award
Indian male poets
20th-century Indian poets
20th-century Indian male writers
Director Generals of Assam police
1943 births